Victor Anderson may refer to:

Victor Anderson (Green politician) in London
Victor Henry Anderson (1917–2001), American Neopagan witch
Victor C. Anderson (1882–1937), American painter
Victor Emanuel Anderson (1902–1962), Governor of Nebraska, USA
Victor Anderson (Georgia politician), American politician